The 2011 Roller Derby World Cup was an international women's roller derby tournament organized by Blood & Thunder magazine.  Teams of amateur skaters from around the world were fielded to compete for their respective nations.

The inaugural 2011 Roller Derby World Cup was hosted by Toronto Roller Derby, and was held December 1 through 4, 2011, at The Bunker at Downsview Park in Toronto, Ontario, Canada.  It was won by Team USA, who beat Team Canada by a score of 336 points to 33 in the final.

Live online coverage of the entire event was broadcast on the Derby News Network.

Participating countries 

The 2011 Roller Derby World Cup had thirteen countries taking part. Each team sent a roster of 20 skaters, plus alternates, to take part. Though not affiliated with the Women's Flat Track Derby Association, the World Cup was played and officiated under a ruleset developed and standardized by the WFTDA. Teams held tryouts during 2011 and started naming the rosters in August.  The participating countries were:

Final standings
The final standings at the completion of the World Cup games were:

Group stage 
All teams competed in the group stage.  Each team was placed in one of four groups, which contained either three or four teams.  Every team played all the other teams in their group, and this process determined the seeding for the elimination stage.

Group A

Group B

Group C

Group D

Elimination stage

Round 1
In the first round of the elimination stage, the ten lowest ranked teams played.  The winners advanced to the quarter finals, while the losers entered the consolation stage.

Quarter finals
In the quarter finals, the five winners from the round 1 were joined by the three top-ranked teams.  The winners advanced to the semi-finals, while the losers entered round 2 of the consolation stage.

Semi finals

Final

Consolation stage

Round 1

Round 2

Consolation Semifinals

Placement round

References

External links 
 Official Blood & Thunder World Cup info page
 http://torontorollerderby.com/ Host
 http://www.derbynewsnetwork.com/ Broadcaster
 http://www.hinckleydesign.com/ Producer
 http://www.canuckderbytv.com/ Boutcast Technical
 http://layer9.ca/ Boutcast Technical

Roller Derby World Cup
Roller Derby World Cup
Roller Derby World Cup
Roller Derby World Cup
Roller Derby World Cup
International sports competitions in Toronto